
Year 331 BC was a year of the pre-Julian Roman calendar. At the time, it was known as the Year of the Consulship of Potitus and Marcellus (or, less frequently, year 423 Ab urbe condita). The denomination 331 BC for this year has been used since the early medieval period, when the Anno Domini calendar era became the prevalent method in Europe for naming years.

Events 
 By place 

 Macedonia 

 Late January – Alexander the Great travels with a small bodyguard (among them is the future Egyptian ruler Ptolemy I Soter) along the coastal road of Egypt and reaches the settlement of Paraetonium on the borders of Cyrenaica. There, he receives a delegation of emissaries from Cyrene, who grants him a number of gifts including fine horses and chariots. Alexander concludes a treaty of peace and alliance with them. He turns inland from the Mediterranean and travels through the Libyan Desert to the Siwah Oasis, which he reaches in late February. Alexander consults the famous oracle and is pronounced the son of Zeus-Ammon as his true father.
 Alexander departs from Egypt and leads his forces towards Phoenicia. He leaves Cleomenes of Naucratis as the ruling nomarch to control Egypt.
 October 1 – Alexander is victorious in the Battle of Gaugamela (near ancient Ninevah) over the Persian King Darius III. Alexander pursues the defeated Persian forces to Arbela, Darius moves his Bactrian cavalry and Greek mercenaries into Media.
 For the first time, Alexander encounters war elephants after the battle in Darius' camp. In the capital, Susa, Alexander gains access to huge treasures amounting to 50,000 gold talents.

 Greece 
 While Alexander is fighting in Asia, Agis III of Sparta, profiting from the Macedonian king's absence from Greece, leads some of the Greek cities in a revolt. With Persian money and 8,000 Greek mercenaries, he holds Crete against Macedonian forces. In the Peloponnesus he routs a force under the Macedonian general Coragus and, although Athens stays neutral, he is joined by Elis, Achaea (except Pellene) and Arcadia, with the exception of Megalopolis, the staunchly anti-Spartan capital of Arcadia, which Agis III's forces besiege.
 Alexander's regent Antipater leads the Macedonians to victory over King Agis III in the Battle of Megalopolis.

 Italy 
 Alexander of Epirus takes Heraclea from the Lucanians, and Terina and Sipontum from the Bruttii.
 Tarentum turns against Alexander of Epirus when they realize that he intends to create a kingdom of his own in southern Italy. Alexander is defeated and killed in the Battle of Pandosia on the banks of the Acheron.

 Roman Republic 
 The Gallic tribe of the Senones and the Romans conclude a peace and enter upon a period of friendly relations which lasts the rest of the century.

Births

Deaths 
 Alexander I of Epirus, Aeacid dynasty king of Epirus (b. c. 370 BC)
 Vahe, legendary king of Armenia and last of the Hyke dynasty

References